Adgaon Khurd is a small village in Rahata taluka of Ahmednagar district in the Indian state of Maharashtra.

Population
As per 2011 census, population of village is 981, of which 520 are males and 461 are females.

Transport

Road
Adgaon Khurd is connected to nearby villages by village roads.

Rail
Shirdi is nearest railway station to village.

Air
Shirdi Airport is located near a village.

See also
List of villages in Rahata taluka

References 

Villages in Ahmednagar district